Kernersville is a town in Forsyth County and the largest suburb of Winston-Salem. The town is located in the U.S. state of North Carolina. A small portion of the town is also in Guilford County.  The population was 26,481 at the 2020 census, up from 23,123 in 2010. Kernersville is located at the center of the Piedmont Triad metropolitan area, between Greensboro to the east, High Point to the south, and Winston-Salem to the west. Some of the farmland surrounding the town has been sold and turned into large middle-to-upper-class housing developments. The Winston-Salem Northern Beltway, a partial loop running around the city of Winston-Salem, as introduced in 2014, and will eventually go through Kernersville by the late 2020’s or early 2030’s. The loop crosses Salem Parkway between Linville Rd and South Main Street. Then further to the south, it crosses I-40 between Union Cross Rd and I-74 and Route 311 near Winston-Salem. Then, it will end with an interchange with I-74 and Route 311 between Union Cross Rd and Ridgewood Rd. Further north, it passes West Mountain St and eventually Route 158 in Walkertown. Another nickname for Kernersville is K-Vegas. Walkertown is 7.1 miles to the west-northwest via Highway 66. Winston-Salem is 11 miles to the west via Salem Parkway. Greensboro is 21 miles to the east via I-40. Wallburg is 9.8 miles to the south via Union Cross Rd and Gumtree Rd. High Point is 14 miles to the southeast via I-74.

History, current events and popularity
The site was first settled by an Irishman named Caleb Story in 1756. Circa 1770, the site was purchased by William Dobson and was called "Dobson's Crossroads". George Washington was served breakfast at Dobson's tavern on June 2, 1791. Joseph Kerner bought the property in 1817, continuing to operate the inn; the town became known as "Kerners Crossroads". Kerner left his property to two sons and a daughter. Not long after the arrival of the railroad, the town was incorporated as "Kernersville" in 1873.

There was brief flirtation with relocating the Minnesota Twins to Kernersville in 1998.

In 2001, NASCAR driver Kevin Harvick opened his shop in Kernersville. Kevin and his wife, Delana, were residents of Kernersville until 2007. Delana and her father, former Nationwide Series driver John Linville, are natives of Kernersville.

In late 2005, President George W. Bush visited Kernersville's Deere-Hitachi plant to give a speech about the American economy. In the summer of 2008, former president Bill Clinton spoke at R. B. Glenn High school. He was campaigning for his wife, Hillary Clinton, in the Democratic primary. Donald Trump Jr. hosted a campaign rally for his father and then-president, Donald Trump, at Salem One Inc. on October 19, 2020.

Former basketball player Turner Battle is from Kernersville.

First Baptist Church, Kernersville Depot, Korner's Folly, Isaac Harrison McKaughan House, North Cherry Street Historic District, Roberts-Justice House, South Main Street Historic District, and Stuart Motor Company are all listed on the National Register of Historic Places.

Improvements

Starting in mid 2006, Century Park went under construction to rebuild the lake that had been drained years before due to a structural issue with its dam. The lake was restocked with fish and renovated, and the park is now accessible from Century Blvd with bathrooms and picnic areas. The project was finished in Spring 2008. Beginning in May 2009 the public is allowed to fish from the lake.

Starting in July 2008, North Main Street was closed through downtown Kernersville. Improvements included widening the road and adding parking along the street. North Main Street was reopened on October 2, 2008. Also, Century Blvd went under construction in the winter of 2008. The construction extended Century Place Blvd which allowed traffic from South Main St to Century Blvd. The construction was finished in January 2009.

The resident houses in the historical district on Salisbury St. were given an ordinance to renovate their homes to match the current renovations done to the roads leading into downtown along with the new bank and park added further downtown. The historical district includes the famous Körner's Folly built 1878–1880, and the Harmon House.

In 2012, complete reconstruction of the Salisbury Street overpass bridge over I-40 business was completed. The new bridge includes stone side walls, sidewalks, and light posts. That same year, new landscaping was put into place around the Main Street exit and entrance ramps from I-40 business. Also beginning in 2012, construction began to replace the Hastings Hill Road overpass bridge to I-40 business. The project is focused around replacing the outdated bridge as well as making the northern part of the road leading to the bridge a straight shot over I-40 business instead of the winding road it currently is. The project may include additional benefits such as exit/entrance ramps to I-40 business. Such access would eliminate the large distance between the closest exits (S. Main St. and Linville Rd.) and provide easier access for motorists to surrounding areas of the overpass.

Beginning in Fall 2013, road construction began to incorporate a traffic circle to the intersection of W. Bodenhamer St. and Dobson St. The project is focused around decreasing the traffic congestion of the intersection around heavy traffic times. The project is estimated to complete in mid-2014.

The intersection of Wallburg Road and Union Cross Road near Union Cross Park had been constructed to where motorists can simply head onto eastbound Union Cross Road and Wallburg Road which also featured installment of traffic lights.

Geography

Demographics

2020 census

As of the 2020 United States census, there were 26,449 people, 10,564 households, and 6,055 families residing in the town.

2010 census
As of the census of 2010, there were 23,123 people, 7,286 households, and 4,663 families residing in the town. The population density was 1,415.7 people per square mile (546.5/km2). There were 7,950 housing units at an average density of 657.2 per square mile (253.7/km2). The racial makeup of the town was 84.11% White, 8.74% African American, 0.32% Native American, 1.26% Asian, 0.05% Pacific Islander, 4.33% from other races, and 1.19% from two or more races. Hispanic or Latino of any race were 7.36% of the population.

There were 7,286 households, out of which 31.4% had children under the age of 18 living with them, 48.3% were married couples living together, 11.7% had a female householder with no husband present, and 36.0% were non-families. 30.4% of all households were made up of individuals, and 8.0% had someone living alone who was 65 years of age or older. The average household size was 2.31 and the average family size was 2.88.

In the town, the population was spread out, with 23.9% under the age of 18, 9.2% from 18 to 24, 33.8% from 25 to 44, 22.7% from 45 to 64, and 10.3% who were 65 years of age or older. The median age was 34 years. For every 100 females, there were 93.0 males. For every 100 females age 18 and over, there were 90.4 males.

The median income for a household in the town was $41,520, and the median income for a family was $52,266. Males had a median income of $36,777 versus $26,873 for females. The per capita income for the town was $23,506. About 6.3% of families and 8.4% of the population were below the poverty line, including 11.6% of those under age 18 and 11.7% of those age 65 or over.

Education
Winston-Salem/Forsyth County Schools serves the community.

Kernersville is served by five public elementary schools, three public middle schools, and two public high schools – Robert B. Glenn High School and East Forsyth High School. These public schools are all a part of the Winston-Salem/Forsyth County Schools system. Kernersville is also home to four private schools, most prominently the Brookside Montessori School and Triad Baptist Christian Academy, as well as Bishop McGuinness Catholic High School. Oak Ridge Military Academy is located in nearby Oak Ridge, North Carolina.   
Kernersville also contains a branch of Forsyth Technical Community College. Numerous colleges and universities are located within easy driving distance of Kernersville, including Salem College, Wake Forest University, Winston-Salem State University, Bennett College, the University of North Carolina at Greensboro, the University of North Carolina School of the Arts, Greensboro College, Guilford College,
Guilford Technical Community College  and North Carolina A&T State University, Piedmont International University, and High Point University.

The Piedmont Triad Japanese School (ピードモントトライアド補習中授業校 Pīdomonto Toraiado Hoshū Jugyō Kō), a weekend Japanese school, previously held its classes in Kernersville.

Transportation
The Piedmont Triad International Airport in Greensboro serves as the region's main airport. US 421 serves as the main east and west freeway in the town. NC 66 goes through the town connecting Kernersville to Stokes County. NC 150 follows along US 421 and it bypasses Kernersville to the east as a limited-access highway after it follows US 421, while I-40 bypasses the town the south.

Attractions
Korner's Folly was built 1878–1880 by Jule Körner, a grandson of Joseph Kerner, the town's namesake. It is now a tourist attraction, as a result of its very unusual design and architecture, featuring 22 rooms on seven levels, and 15 decorated fireplaces. It also houses what is said to be the first private Little Theatre in the U.S., dating to 1896. The house has been featured in The New York Times (March 10, 2006), in Southern Living Magazine (May 2004), and in a televised Our State Magazine production, among others. A model of the house was made into an ornament to represent North Carolina on the White House Christmas Tree in 2001.

In the fall, Fourth of July Park hosts the annual Honeybee Festival.

The Paul J. Ciener Botanical Garden is located at 215 South Main Street in the historical district.

The Town of Kernersville has partnered with the Kernersville Cycling Club to create a park dedicated to mountain biking, the Mountain Bike Single Track Park. The park (located on Smith Edwards Road) was dedicated in the spring of 2013 with a grand opening ceremony.

The town is home to a farmers market, the Kernersville Farmers Market. It is open Wednesdays and Saturdays from May through October.

Kernersville Museum and the Kernersville Depot (1873 Train Depot): The Kernersville Museum Foundation began in 2013. The Kernersville Museum is located at 127 West Mountain Street and focuses on the history of the town of Kernersville. The 1873 Train Depot is the original Train Depot in Kernersville. It was refurbished by the town and completed in 2009.

Skate World Roller Skating Rink opened in 1966. After a large, accidental fire on July 31, 2022, Skate World was closed, and it is unclear if the business will reopen.

Notable people
 Madison Bailey, actress notable for her role of Kiara Carrera on the Netflix series Outer Banks
 Turner Battle, college basketball coach
 Larry R. Brown, former member of the North Carolina House of Representatives
 Drew Fulk, songwriter and producer
 DeLana Harvick, former co-manager of Kevin Harvick Incorporated and wife of NASCAR driver Kevin Harvick
 Chris Lane, country music singer
 Brent LaRue, represented Slovenia in the men's 400 meters hurdles at the 2012 Summer Olympics
 Ben Newnam, professional soccer player
 Ramekon O'Arwisters, artist
 Danny O'Brien, former Canadian Football League quarterback and current coach
 Pat Preston, former NFL player; later served as the athletic director of Wake Forest University from 1954 to 1955
 Kemp Wicker, former MLB pitcher and two-time World Series champion with the New York Yankees (1936, 1937)

References

External links
 Town of Kernersville official website
 Chamber of Commerce with Visitor Information Package
 Paul J. Ciener Botanical Garden

1756 establishments in the Thirteen Colonies
Populated places established in 1756
Towns in Forsyth County, North Carolina
Towns in Guilford County, North Carolina
Towns in North Carolina